Ophrys bertolonii, commonly known as Bertoloni's bee orchid, is a species of orchid native to the western and central Mediterranean (Spain, France, Corsica, Sardinia, Sicily, mainland Italy, Albania, and Croatia).

References

External links 

Tela Botanica, Ophrys aurélien
Arkive, Wildscreeen, Bertoloni's bee orchid (Ophrys bertolonii)
Orchidées Nature, Ophrys bertolonii
Juzaphoto, Ophrys bertolonii

bertolonii
Orchids of France
Orchids of Europe
Flora of Sicily
Flora of Sardinia
Flora of Corsica
Flora of Albania
Flora of Croatia